USS Talofa (SP-1016) was a United States Navy patrol vessel in commission from 1917 to 1919.

Talofa was built in 1910 as a private steam yacht of the same name by George Lawley & Son at Neponset, Massachusetts. In April 1917, the U.S. Navy acquired her under a free lease from her owner, Eben H. Ellison, for use as a section patrol boat during World War I; sources disagree on the date of acquisition, claiming both 16 and 28 April 1917. She was commissioned as USS Talofa (SP-1016); sources also disagree on her commissioning date, claiming both 16 April and 8 May  1917.

Assigned to the 1st Naval District in northern New England, Talofa carried out patrol duties through the end of World War I and into 1919.

The Navy returned Talofa to Ellison by no later than 24 April 1919, and her name subsequently was stricken from the Navy List.

Notes

References

Department of the Navy Naval History and Heritage Command Online Library of Selected Images: Civilian Ships: Talofa (American Steam Yacht, 1910). Served as USS Talofa (SP-1016) in 1917-1919
NavSource Online: Section Patrol Craft Photo Archive Talofa (SP 1016)

Patrol vessels of the United States Navy
World War I patrol vessels of the United States
Ships built in Boston
1910 ships